Marissa Everett (born August 29, 1997) is a retired American soccer player who most recently played as a forward for Portland Thorns FC.

Career
Everett made her professional debut for Portland Thorns FC in the NWSL on May 26, 2019, coming on as a substitute in the 79th minute for Simone Charley against Sky Blue FC, which finished as a 1–0 away win. She would go onto make four appearances in her rookie season, scoring one goal.  

The 2020 pandemic saw her get limited opportunity, making six appearances that year in all competitions. She would win the 2020 NWSL Fall series with Portland.

Everett made fourteen appearances and scored two goals in 2021, winning the Women's International Champion Cup and the 2021 NWSL Challenge Cup.  She made fifteen appearances in 2022, scoring twice, and would win the NWSL Championship.

She announced her retirement from football on November 15, 2022, indicating through twitter.

Honors 
Portland Thorns FC

 NWSL Fall Series: 2020 National Women's Soccer League Fall Series
 NWSL Challenge Cup: 2021 National Women's Soccer League Challenge Cup
 Women's International Champions Cup: 2021 WICC
 NWSL Championship: 2022

References

External links
 Player profile

1997 births
Living people
People from Canyon Lake, California
Soccer players from California
American women's soccer players
Women's association football forwards
Portland Thorns FC players
National Women's Soccer League players
Oregon Ducks women's soccer players